Christoffel van Sichem (1581, Basel – 1658, Amsterdam), was a Dutch Golden Age woodcutter and engraver.

Biography
According to the RKD he made woodcuts of famous people after his father, Christoffel van Sichem the Elder. He was the brother of Karel Sichem who published many of his prints. Van Sichem also made woodcuts after portraits by leading artists such as Abraham Bloemaert, Hendrick Goltzius and Maarten van Heemskerck, among others. He made these for various publications and then he bundled and published them himself in "Der zielen Lust-Hof '.

Works
 "Bibels tresoor, ofte Der zielen lvsthof", by Christoffel van Sichem,  Pieter Jacobsz. Paets, Leuven & Amsterdam, 1646
 "'t Schat der zielen, dat is: het geheele leven ons Heeren Iesu Christi: naer de vyer euangelisten", by C. van Sichem & H. Hugo,  P.I. Paets, Amsterdam, 1648

References

author page in the DBNL
Sichem family on GAMEO
Christoffel van Sichem the Younger on Artnet

1581 births
1658 deaths
Dutch Golden Age printmakers
Artists from Basel-Stadt
Dutch Mennonites
Mennonite artists